The House at 112 Park Street, also known as the Browne Residence, in Thompson Falls, Montana was built in 1911–12.  It was listed on the National Register of Historic Places in 1986.

It was a one-story frame house with several elements of Bungalow, including its front porch under its hipped roof, supported by battered columns.  In 1984 its roof was covered by asbestos shingles.  It was built by contractor Charles H. Doenges, with design likely from a pattern book, for his brother Louis Doenges.

References

Houses on the National Register of Historic Places in Montana
Houses completed in 1912
1912 establishments in Montana
National Register of Historic Places in Sanders County, Montana
Bungalow architecture in Montana
Thompson Falls, Montana